

List of notable Indian Exchange Traded funds, or ETFs. 
 Reliance Gold Exchange Traded Scheme
 Reliance ETF Liquid BeES (formerly Goldman Sachs Liquid Exchange Traded Scheme) Dividend Reinvestment
 Reliance Nifty Exchange Traded Scheme
 Reliance Nifty Junior Exchange Traded Scheme
 Reliance Nifty Sharia Exchange Traded Scheme(NSE: SHARIABEES)
 HDFC Mutual Fund - HDFC Gold Exchange Traded Fund
 ICICI Prudential Mutual Fund - Bharat-22 Index Exchange Traded Fund (NSE: BHARATIWIN)
 Invesco India Nifty Exchange Traded Fund (NSE: IVZINNIFTY)
 Invesco India Gold Exchange Traded Fund (NSE: IVZINGOLD)
 Kotak Mutual Fund - Gold Exchange Traded Fund
 Kotak Mutual Fund - PSU Bank Exchange Traded Fund (NSE: KOTAKPSUBK)
 Kotak Mutual Fund - Banking Exchange Traded Fund Dividend Payout Option (NSE: KOTAKBKETF)
 Kotak Mutual Fund - Nifty Index Exchange Traded Fund (NSE: KOTAKNIFTY)
 Kotak Mutual Fund - Sensex Index Exchange Traded Fund (BSE: KOTAKSENSEX)
 Kotak Mutual Fund - Nifty NV20 Index Exchange Traded Fund(NSE: KOTAKNV20)
 Motilal Oswal Mutual Fund - Motilal Oswal MOSt Shares M50 ETF
 Motilal Oswal Mutual Fund - Motilal Oswal MOSt Shares M100 ETF
 Motilal Oswal Mutual Fund - Motilal Oswal MOSt Shares Nasdaq Index N100 ETF (NSE: N100)
 Reliance Shares Gold ETF
 SBI Mutual Fund - SBI Gold Exchange Traded Scheme - Growth Option
 UTI Mutual Fund (Unit Trust of India Mutual Fund) - UTI Gold Exchange Traded Fund
 UTI Mutual Fund (Unit Trust of India Mutual Fund) - UTI Nifty Next 50 Exchange Traded Fund(NSE: UTINEXT50)

List of all ETF listed on NSE as on 19 Mar 2021

See also
List of exchange-traded funds

References

External links
 List of ETFs

Indian
Economy of India lists
Capital markets of India
Companies listed on the National Stock Exchange of India